Catalan's conjecture (or Mihăilescu's theorem) is a theorem in number theory that was conjectured by the mathematician Eugène Charles Catalan in 1844 and proven in 2002 by Preda Mihăilescu at Paderborn University.  The integers 23 and 32 are two perfect powers (that is, powers of exponent higher than one) of natural numbers whose values (8 and 9, respectively) are consecutive. The theorem states that this is the only case of two consecutive perfect powers.  That is to say, that

History
The history of the problem dates back at least to Gersonides, who proved a special case of the conjecture in 1343 where (x, y) was restricted to be (2, 3) or (3, 2).  The first significant progress after Catalan made his conjecture came in 1850 when Victor-Amédée Lebesgue dealt with the case b = 2.

In 1976, Robert Tijdeman applied Baker's method in transcendence theory to establish a bound on a,b and used existing results bounding x,y in terms of a, b to give an effective upper bound for x,y,a,b.

Catalan's conjecture was proven by Preda Mihăilescu in April 2002. The proof was published in the Journal für die reine und angewandte Mathematik, 2004. It makes extensive use of the theory of cyclotomic fields and Galois modules.  An exposition of the proof was given by Yuri Bilu in the Séminaire Bourbaki.  In 2005, Mihăilescu published a simplified proof.

Pillai's conjecture

Pillai's conjecture concerns a general difference of perfect powers : it is an open problem initially proposed by S. S. Pillai, who conjectured that the gaps in the sequence of perfect powers tend to infinity.  This is equivalent to saying that each positive integer occurs only finitely many times as a difference of perfect powers: more generally, in 1931 Pillai conjectured that for fixed positive integers A, B, C the equation  has only finitely many solutions (x, y, m, n) with (m, n) ≠ (2, 2).  Pillai proved that the difference  for any λ less than 1, uniformly in m and n.

The general conjecture would follow from the ABC conjecture.

Paul Erdős conjectured that the ascending sequence  of perfect powers satisfies  for some positive constant c and all sufficiently large n.

Pillai's conjecture means that for every natural number n, there are only finitely many pairs of perfect powers with difference n. See also  for the smallest solution (> 0).

See also

Beal's conjecture
Equation xy = yx
Fermat–Catalan conjecture
Mordell curve
Ramanujan–Nagell equation
Størmer's theorem
Tijdeman's theorem
Thaine's theorem

Notes

References
 
 
 
 
 
 
   Predates Mihăilescu's proof.

External links
 
 Ivars Peterson's MathTrek
 On difference of perfect powers
 Jeanine Daems: A Cyclotomic Proof of Catalan's Conjecture

Conjectures
Conjectures that have been proved
Diophantine equations
Theorems in number theory